The men's triple jump at the 2012 IAAF World Indoor Championships took place March 10 and 11 at the Ataköy Athletics Arena.

Medalists

Records

Qualification standards

Schedule

Results

Qualification

Qualification standard 17.00 m (Q) or at least best 8 qualified.  13 athletes from 10 countries participated.  One athlete did not start the competition.  The qualification round started at 09:35 and ended at 10:25.

Final

8 athletes from 6 countries participated.  The final started at 16:10 and ended at 17:17.

References

Triple Jump
Triple jump at the World Athletics Indoor Championships